Phazaca kellersi is a species of moth of the family Uraniidae first described by Tams in 1935. It is found in Samoa and was described by two specimen from Tutuila collected by H.C. Kellers.

References

moths described in 1935
Uraniidae